Roosevelt "Rosey" Grier (born July 14, 1932) is an American actor, singer, Protestant minister, and former professional football player. He was a notable college football player for Pennsylvania State University who earned a retrospective place in the National Collegiate Athletic Association 100th anniversary list of 100 most influential student athletes. As a professional player, Grier was a member of the New York Giants and the original Fearsome Foursome of the Los Angeles Rams.  He played in the Pro Bowl twice.

After Grier's professional sports career, he worked as a bodyguard for Senator Robert Kennedy during the 1968 presidential campaign. Grier was guarding Ethel Kennedy when Senator Kennedy was shot. Although unable to prevent the assassination, Grier took control of the gun and subdued the shooter, Sirhan Sirhan.

Grier hosted his own Los Angeles television show and made approximately 70 guest appearances on various shows during the 1960s and 1970s.

Grier is known for his serious pursuit of hobbies not traditionally associated with men. Grier became an ordained Protestant minister in 1983 and travels as an inspirational speaker. He founded American Neighborhood Enterprises, a nonprofit organization that serves inner city youth.

Early life
Born in Cuthbert, Georgia as one of twelve children, Grier was named after Franklin Delano Roosevelt.

Grier played high school football at Abraham Clark High School in Roselle, New Jersey, graduating in 1951. At Penn State, he won the IC4A and Penn Relays shot put and discus, as well as qualifying for the javelin finals, and was a Track & Field All-American in 1954 and 1955.

Professional football career
After playing on the defensive line on the Penn State University football team, Grier was drafted as the 31st overall pick in the third round of the 1955 NFL Draft by the New York Giants. He played with the Giants from 1955 to 1962, during which he led the team to an NFL Championship in 1956 and the Eastern Conference Championship in 1958, 1959, 1961 and 1962. Grier was selected for the Pro Bowl in 1956 and 1960, and was named All-Pro at the defensive tackle position in 1956 and 1958–1962.

Grier was then traded in July 1963 to the Los Angeles Rams in exchange for defensive tackle John LoVetere and a high future draft pick. He was part of the "Fearsome Foursome", along with Deacon Jones, Merlin Olsen, and Lamar Lundy, considered one of the best defensive lines in football history. His career ended in 1967 due to a torn Achilles tendon. Despite being the oldest member of the Fearsome Foursome, Grier is the last surviving member following the passing of Deacon Jones on June 3, 2013.

Post-football career

Television

After his retirement, Grier hosted the Rosey Grier Show on KABC-TV, a weekly half-hour television show discussing community affairs in Los Angeles.

Bodyguard
Grier served as a bodyguard for his friend, United States senator and presidential candidate Robert F. Kennedy. He was guarding Ethel Kennedy, the Senator's wife, who was then expecting a child, the night that Kennedy was assassinated in Los Angeles in 1968. Grier and Olympic decathlon gold medalist Rafer Johnson heard shots fired ahead of them. As Grier caught up he saw men wrestling with gunman Sirhan Sirhan. Grier jumped into the fray. Grier states, "So I see George Plimpton has the gun pointed at his face, and I'm concerned that it is going to go off, so I put my hand under the trigger housing and I pulled back the hammer so it couldn't strike. I wrench the gun from Sirhan. I find the pin and I ripped it out and held it. Now I have the gun in my hand, so I shove it in my pocket." Grier later said, "I grabbed the man's legs and dragged him onto a table. There was a guy angrily twisting the killer's legs and other angry faces coming towards him, as though they were going to tear him to pieces. I fought them off. I would not allow more violence."

USO
In December 1968, he accompanied Bob Hope on "Operation Holly," Hope's 1968 USO tour, Grier performed alongside headliner Ann-Margret and others at the U.S. bases at Long Bình, Cam Ranh Bay, Da Nang, Chu Lai, and Phù Cát, as well as aboard the carrier USS Hancock and the battleship USS New Jersey, and at Korat Royal Thai Air Force Base and U-Tapao Royal Thai Navy Airfield in Thailand, along with stops in South Korea and Guam.

Acting

Grier has appeared in a number of films and television shows. One of the first football stars to successfully make the transition to acting, he made about 70 television guest appearances. They include a role as one of the security contingent in "The Brain Killer Affair" episode of The Man from U.N.C.L.E. (1964), as well as a cameo playing an athletic trainer in an episode of I Dream of Jeannie. He became a regular cast member, starting in 1969, on the series Daniel Boone, Make Room for Granddaddy, and The White Shadow. In one White Shadow appearance, he donned his No. 76 Los Angeles Rams jersey from his NFL playing days.

He appeared as a panelist on the television game show Match Game 74. Grier starred in television shows and films including The Wild, Wild West (1967), Desperate Mission (1969), Carter's Army (1970), Skyjacked (1972), The Thing with Two Heads (1972), McMillan & Wife (1974), The Treasure of Jamaica Reef (1975), Movin' On (1975-1976), The Love Boat (1979), The Glove (1979), Roots: The Next Generations (1979) and The Seekers (1979). Grier appeared in the 1974–1976 NBC TV series Movin' On with Claude Akins, which was filmed in Grier's home state of Georgia. He appeared in a third-season episode of Quincy, M.E. titled "Crib Job" in which he played himself as the director of a group called Giant Step. He appeared in two episodes of Kojak, one in the third season and one in the fourth season, as a bounty hunter named Salathiel Harms. He also appeared on a 1977 episode of CHiPs as a distraught motorist who, during a routine traffic stop, proceeds to destroy his car in frustration by pulling it apart piece by piece. He appeared as a celebrity contestant on Celebrity Bullseye during that program's 1981–82 season. Grier also guest-voiced a 1999 episode of The Simpsons titled "Sunday, Cruddy Sunday".

Singing

Grier first released singles on the A label in 1960, and over the following twenty-five years he continued to record on various labels including Liberty, Ric, MGM, and A&M. His recording of a tribute to Robert Kennedy, "People Make the World" (written by Bobby Womack), was his only chart single, peaking at No. 128 in 1968. Grier sang "It's All Right to Cry" for the children's album and TV program Free to Be… You and Me.

Politics
Greir spent his early life campaigning for Democrats before becoming a Republican in the early 80s. He appeared in the Democratic fundraiser "America Goes Public" on September 15, 1973  and regularly attended the Democratic National Convention, including the conventions at the International Amphitheatre in Chicago on August 28, 1968  and at Madison Square Garden in New York City on August 11, 1980.

Reagan
He was a featured speaker at the 1984 Republican National Convention; during its evening session on August 20, 1984, he endorsed President Ronald Reagan for re-election.

2018 gubernatorial bid 

On January 5, 2017, Grier announced his intention to run for governor of California as a Republican in the 2018 California gubernatorial election. He ended his candidacy in July 2017.

Community service

Grier has also written a number of books, and now travels the United States as an inspirational speaker. He is a cofounder of American Neighborhood Enterprises, an organization that works to help disadvantaged city dwellers buy homes and receive vocational training. Grier was ordained a Protestant minister in 1983, and the next year he founded his nonprofit resource center for inner-city teens, developing spiritual and educational programs for disadvantaged youths.

Grier is a prominent member of Alpha Phi Alpha fraternity. He is also on the Milken Family Foundation board of trustees and serves as its program administrator of community affairs.

He has been honored by Penn State as recipient of the Distinguished Alumni Award in 1974, and the Alumni Fellow Award in 1991. He was named to the NCAA's "List of the 100 Most Influential Student-Athletes" published to commemorate the NCAA's 100th anniversary. In 1997, he was inducted into the New Jersey Sports Hall of Fame.

In 2017, he was inducted into the New Jersey Hall of Fame.

Personal life 
Grier was well known in the 1970s for his hobbies of needlepoint  and macrame. He authored Rosey Grier's Needlepoint for Men in 1973.

Grier has a daughter from a previous relationship named Sherryl Brown-Tubbs. He later married Bernice Lewis, who had one child, Denise, whom he adopted before he and Lewis divorced. He then married Margie Grier and had a son, Roosevelt Kennedy Grier, in 1972. He and Margie divorced in 1978 and remarried in 1980. Margie Grier died on June 10, 2011. He married Wichita school teacher Cydnee Seyler on April 30, 2013.   A nephew, Mike "Big Daddy" Grier, followed his uncle's career in sports when he enrolled as a student at Boston University, but he played ice hockey instead of football; he subsequently had a 14 year NHL playing career and became the league's first black general manager with the San Jose Sharks. He is the cousin of Pam Grier.

Bibliography
 Rosey Grier's Needlepoint for Men (1973)
 Rosey, an Autobiography: The Gentle Giant (1986)
 Winning (1990)
 Shooting Star: Sometimes You Find What You Didn't Even Know You Were Looking For...: A Novel (1993)
 "Rosey Grier's All-American Heroes: Today's Multicultural Success Stories"(1993) The Glory Game: How the 1958 NFL Championship Changed Football Forever'' (2008)

References

External links

 Rosey Grier filmography
 Rosey Grier football statistics
 Needlepoint for Men by Rosey Grier (1973)
 
 [ Roosevelt Grier biography at All Music Guide]
 Image of Roosevelt Grier shakes hands with children at the Watts Summer Festival, Los Angeles, California, 1971. Los Angeles Times Photographic Archive (Collection 1429). UCLA Library Special Collections, Charles E. Young Research Library, University of California, Los Angeles.

1932 births
Living people
Abraham Clark High School alumni
African-American male actors
African-American players of American football
American Christian clergy
American football defensive linemen
American male film actors
American male television actors
Assassination of Robert F. Kennedy
California Republicans
College football announcers
Eastern Conference Pro Bowl players
Liberty Records artists
Los Angeles Rams players
New York Giants players
Penn State Nittany Lions football players
People from Cuthbert, Georgia
People from Roselle, New Jersey
Players of American football from Georgia (U.S. state)
Players of American football from New Jersey
Sportspeople from Union County, New Jersey
United Service Organizations entertainers